Scrappers was a reality television series about three competing groups of scrappers from Brooklyn, New York who collect and sell scrap metal. The series premiered 3 August 2010 at 10pm on Spike TV. The show was eventually scrapped itself on September 21 of the same year, after it failed to be renewed for a second season.

Scrap crews
The first scrap crew featured in the show is "Scrappers U.S.A.", made up of Frankie Noots (Frank Fidilio), Joe Posa, and Darren. The second group is "P&F Service and Removal", headed by Sal the Barber and his employee Greg. The third group is Mimmo (pronounced mee-mo) and Dino, who are unaffiliated.

Shooting locations
Scrappers is shot entirely on location in Brooklyn, New York, mostly in the neighborhoods of Gravesend, Bensonhurst, and the other areas immediately surrounding.

Episodes

See also
 American Pickers, a similar show on the History Channel

References

External links
  on Spike TV
 
 
 Scrappers U.S.A.
 P&F Service & Removal, Inc.

2010 American television series debuts
2010 American television series endings
2010s American reality television series
English-language television shows
Spike (TV network) original programming
Television shows set in New York City
Television series by Entertainment One